Poricella is a genus of bryozoans belonging to the family Arachnopusiidae.

The genus has almost cosmopolitan distribution.

Species:

Poricella areolata 
Poricella bifurcata 
Poricella brancoensis 
Poricella bugei
Poricella caribbensis 
Poricella catenularia 
Poricella cayensis 
Poricella celleporoides 
Poricella cookae 
Poricella davidi 
Poricella fourtaui 
Poricella frigorosa 
Poricella garbovensis 
Poricella horrida 
Poricella lanceolata 
Poricella lidgardi 
Poricella maconnica 
Poricella malleolus 
Poricella mucronata 
Poricella musaica 
Poricella oranensis 
Poricella perplexa 
Poricella pouyetae 
Poricella robusta 
Poricella spathulata 
Poricella subspatulata 
Poricella tripora

References

Bryozoan genera